Tin(II) 2-ethylhexanoate or tin(II) octoate or stannous octoate (Sn(Oct)2) is a compound of tin. Produced by the reaction of tin(II) oxide and 2-ethylhexanoic acid, it is a clear colorless liquid at room temperature, though often appears yellow due to impurities, likely resulting from oxidation of Sn(II) to Sn(IV).

It is sometimes used as a catalyst for ring-opening polymerization, such as for the production of polylactic acid.

References

Tin(II) compounds
Ethylhexanoates